Frederick of Luxembourg (965 – 6 October 1019), Count of Moselgau, was a son of Siegfried of Luxembourg and Hedwig of Nordgau.

Frederick married Irmtrud, daughter of Count Herbert of Wetterau. They had issue:
 Henry VII (d. 1047), Count of Luxembourg and Duke of Bavaria
 Frederick, Duke of Lower Lorraine (1003–1065), Duke of Lower Lorraine
 Giselbert of Luxembourg (1007–1059), Count of Longwy, of Salm, and of Luxembourg
 Adalbéron III (d. 1072), Bishop of Metz
 Thierry of Luxembourg, father of :
 Thierry (d. 1075)
 Henry, Count Palatine of Lorraine (d. 1095)
 Poppon of Metz (d. 1103), Bishop of Metz
Hermann of Gleiberg
 Ogive of Luxembourg (990/95–1030); married in 1012 to Baldwin IV (980–1035), Count of Flanders
 Imiza of Luxembourg married Welf II of Altdorf, Count in Lechrain (d. 1030)
 Oda of Luxembourg; canoness at Remiremont, then Abbess of Saint-Rémy at Lunéville
 Gisèle of Luxembourg (1019–after 1058); married Radulfe, Lord of Aalst (d. after 1038); parents of Gilbert de Gant

References

Sources

965 births
1019 deaths
House of Luxembourg